Spin is an American Disney Channel Original Movie (DCOM) directed by Manjari Makijany from a screenplay by Carley Steiner and Josh A. Cagan. Produced by Disney Channel Original Productions, the film stars Avantika Vandanapu, Meera Syal, Abhay Deol, Aryan Simhadri, Michael Bishop, Jahbril Cook, Kerri Medders, and Anna Cathcart and premiered on August 13, 2021.
The film received positive reviews, especially for its performances.

Plot

After the death of her mother, Indian-American teenager Rhea Kumar works at her family's restaurant "Spirit of India" with her brother Rohan, her dad Arvind and her maternal grandmother (Nani in Hindi) Asha. While on her Sunday dinner shift, she meets Max, a transfer student from England, a DJ who she shares a Calculus class with, and his mother. Sundays are also special in the restaurant because of Nani's special performance to classic Bollywood songs. At home, we see Arvind partly reeling from the emotional turmoil of losing his wife eight years ago. Although Nani tries to convince him to move on and let it go, it's hard for him.

Meanwhile, in a flashback, we are shown a younger Rhea (eight years old) in her room at night, complaining to her mother Meera she cannot sleep because of the overwhelming sounds from the nearby electronic dance music festival, and the radio. Meera describes to her the different sounds she can hear, and shows her she doesn't have to take it all in, just the sounds she likes, before telling her , "it's all music". She then kisses her goodnight, and leaves the room, humming the lullaby she would always hum to her while doing that. Back to the present, Rhea goes to sleep.

The next morning, she and her friends Watson, Molly, and Gingers gossip about Max, then shift to talking about Rhea's idea of the homecoming fundraiser "Festival of Colors", inspired by the Hindu festival of Holi, before they go to class. In the class, Watson and Molly present their pizza drone, but the pizza drops before they can land it safely. Miss Naomi asks them to clean up, before she calls on Rhea, who presents an app for tracking inventory and sales at her family restaurant. Although Miss Naomi is relieved that it's not a failure like the pizza drone, she is a bit unsettled because the assignment was supposed to be about fun projects. Even though Rhea insists this is fun for her, Miss Naomi, even though she accepts that insistence for the time being, is uncertain whether Rhea feels burdened by responsibility. Later that night, Rhea shows Arvind the app for the restaurant, and Arvind is impressed and happy.

The next day, while the rest of the gang have their lunch, Ginger runs to them in panic after the DJ she had hired for the festival is unavailable, and Rhea, after she remembers having bonded with Max about music, playlists and mixes, recommends him to Ginger. The event is a success despite Ginger's constant anxiety, and Max thanks Rhea for recommending him to Ginger, offering to repay her kindness. She is initially hesitant, but finally asks him to teach her the art of the turntable, and Max agrees to take her to the vinyl store. The next day, at the vinyl store, he shows her what each of the parts of the turntable do, and they are at it on the turntable when their common favorite DJ Luka Cent walks in, drawn by the music, clearly liking it, and asks them to meet him at the billing counter, where they get flyers for the contest "Battle of the Beatmasters". They bond over coffee and Max invites her for practice at his house. Over the next few days, she learns more about the art of DJ mixing, and improves daily.

Responsibility beckons as she ends up being late for her dinner shift, and her work-life balance falls apart as she either turns up late at school or does not turn up at all, even when they are working on improving the track that he made and which was rejected by Ginger. It all starts to crack when the plates she's carrying fall down and break, although Nani is there to save her day. Finally on the day of the fundraiser, she is tasked with looking after the enormous amount of guests of a baby-shower, which she sneaks out of to attend the festival and enjoy with her friends. When the track has been played, Max fails to acknowledge Rhea, leading to an argument between him and her after the show, while unbeknownst to Max, Rhea's gang has been watching them, and confronts him after she storms out.

Back home, Arvind grounds Rhea for two months. Discouraged by how everything's falling apart, and heartbroken that Max did not acknowledge her after she helped him create the track, at the cost of her own integrity and peace of mind, she turns to her Nani, who tells her it's not on her to keep her father happy when he can't move on from Meera's death thinking he has only the restaurant and them both to care for. About her not being acknowledged by Max, Nani tells Rhea she will make more tracks, and "fill the world with so much music it will crush him", and when Rhea confides in Nani about her fear that she may have given him her best ideas, Nani smiles and recounts how Meera used to have the same notion, the same dark cloud of mope, exhaustion and sorrow over her, thinking the "well has run dry", and before Nani knew, Meera would hum a new tune as she walked around the house. Nani then takes out a box containing Meera's prized possessions, including her wedding gajra, her cassettes, and her cassette player. Rhea spends the night and the next morning listening to those cassettes and something sparks in her amid the calm.

Later one day, her gang turns up at her doorstep with DJ equipment from Molly's Gen-X-er father's basement, and with news that they entered her into the contest with an edit of her playlists. Although adamant up to that point that she won't compete, she finally decides to enter the contest after Ginger shows her Max has already entered, that too with the track she practically made for him with much sacrifice.

Over the next few days, she starts working on her track, while her friends procure sounds and footage for her. She also incorporates her mother's music in the track she has prepared for the final. When her Nani listens to the track, she feels as if Meera is back with her, and they prepare for the contest, Nani with her makeup and dress to support her daughter and Rhea with her equipment and her attire, and both of them taking a day off from the restaurant. Amid all the rush, they, along with the gang and Miss Naomi, reach the venue, and both Rhea and Max crush the semi-finals, reaching the finals. Meanwhile, at the restaurant, Arvind catches Rohan watching Ginger's Instagram Live feed with Rhea in it, and realizes he had been lied to about groceries. He takes Rohan along with him to the venue of the contest, to confront Rhea.

Back at the contest, Max has already played the track Rhea made for him, and has received a round of applause from everybody but the gang. As Rhea's turn approaches, she takes a deep breath before she comes to the stage. When she puts on her track, people start to sway, and everybody's initially intrigued, finally getting to the groove. When Arvind does arrive, it is at this moment that he hears his late wife's musical voice on the speaker, and is both overwhelmed and happy that she's watching from above over her daughter, realizing that this is where Rhea is happy. He discards the idea of confronting Rhea, and joins Nani, Miss Naomi and the gang in dancing to the music. After the track ends, Rhea and Max are called to the stage, and Rhea is declared the winner. Max, having been defeated by her, and regretting not having cared about her, runs away amidst the crowd of newfound fans Rhea meets outside.

The mid-credits show that Sunday nights at the restaurant are now DJ nights, with DJ Rhea on the turntable; Watson and Molly have finally perfected their pizza drone project which now also serves food to the guests; Naomi and Arvind have been growing closer since the contest. Rhea is happy, having finally found what she wanted to do, and honoring her late mother.

Cast
 Avantika Vandanapu as Rhea Kumar, a young girl from a multigenerational family, who discovers her true talent upon falling in love with a DJ
 Meera Syal as Asha Kumar, Rhea's spirited grandmother
 Abhay Deol as Arvind Kumar, Rhea's father
 Aryan Simhadri as Rohan Kumar, Rhea's younger brother
 Michael Bishop as Max, the DJ Rhea falls in love with.
 Anna Cathcart as Molly
 Jahbril Cook as Watson
 Kerri Medders as Ginger
 Kyana Teresa as Naomi Eloi
 Tyler Kyte as DJ Luka Cent

Production
On March 17, 2020, it was reported that Disney was developing a film titled Spin for its streaming service, Disney+. Manjari Makijany was set to direct the film, with Carley Steiner, Céline Geiger, and Josh A. Cagan set to write the screenplay. Zanne Devine was to serve as an executive producer on the film.

On August 20, 2020, it was reported that the film was being re-developed as a Disney Channel Original Movie, with most of the production crew remaining attached to the film, except for Geiger.

In August 2020, Avantika Vandanapu was cast in the lead role. On September 29, 2020, Meera Syal, Abhay Deol, Aryan Simhadri, Michael Bishop, Jahbril Cook, Kerri Medders, and Anna Cathcart joined the cast for the film.

Principal photography for Spin began on October 5, 2020, in Toronto, Ontario, Canada and wrapped on November 20, 2020. The film was also filmed in Brampton, creating an on-street set for the parents' restaurant, called the Spirit of India.

Release
Spin premiered on August 13, 2021, on Disney Channel. However, the film was originally set to be released on Disney's streaming service, Disney+. In India, the film premiered on Disney+ Hotstar and Disney International HD on August 15, 2021, coinciding Indian Independence Day.

Reception

Critical reception 
Amy Amatangelo of Paste praised the performances and limited focus on romance, stating, "While the movie touches on all the sweet moments of first crushes—the thrill of holding someone’s hand for the first time!—writers Carley Steiner and Josh Cagan and director Manjari Makijany don’t make Spin about Max and Rhea’s burgeoning romance." Proma Khosla of Mashable gave a positive review of the movie, saying, "Spin is revolutionary because it doesn't feel that way at all; it joins the delightful DCOM movie library and feels completely at home."

Udita Jhunjhunwala of Firstpost rated the movie 3 out of 5, indicating, "Spin is a Disney Channel movie (aimed at children and teenagers) that’s colourful, clean and musical. What sets it apart are the Indian American teenager at the centre, her easy-going Indian family and their genuine assimilation into life in America, whims and culture intact." Renuka Vyavahare of The Times of India rated the movie 3 out of 5 stars, writing, "Spin is much more than your standard coming of age story, where Indian-American protagonists must hustle to find their place in American culture, while essentially being raised in an Indian household. Their emotional discord while fitting into two diverse cultures is interesting but what’s more fascinating is how specific and yet universal these new stories are." Ians of ABP Live gave the movie a 3 out of 5 stars rating, claiming, "Although the plot is not particularly novel, writers Josh A. Cagan and Carley Steiner's script, sans any fantasy elements, maintain the typical Disney tropes. Read on. [...] Overall, the film boasts of a decent production quality and appears to be Disney's first attempt at a crossover film."

Accolades 
The film received the ReFrame Stamp for the years 2021 to 2022. The stamp is awarded by the gender equity coalition ReFrame and industry database IMDbPro for film and television projects that are proven to have gender-balanced hiring, with stamps being awarded to projects that hire female-identifying people, especially women of color, in four out of eight key roles for their production.

References

2021 television films
2021 films
Films about Asian Americans
Films about Indian Americans
Disney Channel Original Movie films
2020s English-language films
2020s teen films
American dance films
American teen musical films
Films shot in Toronto
Films scored by Marius de Vries
Films about DJs
Films directed by Manjari Makijany
2020s American films